Minkus may refer to:

People 
 Christian Minkus (1770–1849), German politician;
 Ludwig (Leon) Minkus (1826-1917), Austrian ballet composer and violinist, best known for his work in Russia;
 Jacques Minkus (1901-1996), philatelic dealer;
 Hannelore Minkus (born 1928), German actress; (de)
 Friedrich Minkus (born 1968), German architect; (de)

Other 
 Minkus catalog for stamp collectors

Jewish surnames